WEWO (1460 AM) is a radio station broadcasting a Gospel format. It is licensed to Laurinburg, North Carolina, United States. It is currently owned by Service Media, Inc. and features programming from ABC Radio.

History
When WEWO signed on in the 1940s, the call letters officially meant "Wonderful Environment, Wonderful Opportunity," though the station's personalities came up with other meanings, such as "We Entertain Women Only" and "We Eat Wild Onions."

In April 1996, Beasley Broadcasting announced plans to buy WEWO, a sports talk station, and WAZZ.

In 1998, Wes Cookman, the owner of WIDU in Fayetteville, bought WEWO and made it part of the "WE-DO" black gospel and news and information network, along with WAGR. WFMO was added later.

References

External links

EWO